Gwyn Hughes may refer to:

 Gwyn Hughes (cricketer) (born 1941), Welsh cricketer
 Gwyn Hughes (footballer) (1922–1999), Welsh footballer